Sir Anthony Love; Or, The Rambling Lady is a 1690 comedy play by the Irish writer Thomas Southerne. It was originally staged by the United Company at the Theatre Royal, Drury Lane with a cast that included Susanna Mountfort in a breeches role as Sir Anthony Love, William Mountfort as Valentine, Joseph Williams as Ilford, William Bowen as  Sir Gentle Golding, Anthony Leigh as An Abbe, John Hodgson as Count Canaile, Samuel Sandford as Count Verole, George Bright as Waitwell, Colley Cibber as Servant to Sir Gentle, Charlotte Butler as  Floriante, Anne Bracegirdle as Charlote and Frances Maria Knight as Volante. The play's incidental music was composed by Henry Purcell.

References

Bibliography
 Van Lennep, W. The London Stage, 1660-1800: Volume One, 1660-1700. Southern Illinois University Press, 1960.

1690 plays
West End plays
Plays by Thomas Southerne
Restoration comedy